Starblanket may refer to: 
A blanket (of native culture) sew together with different articles of fabric that forms a star in the middle.
It is typically given to people as gifts for special occasions (birth, graduation, marriage etc).

People
 Ahtahkakoop (Cree: Atāhkakohp, "Starblanket", c. 1816–1896), Cree chief
 Ahchuchhwahauhhatohapit, or Ahchacoosacootacoopits (Cree: Acāhkosa kā-otakohpit, "[One who has] Star[s for a ]blanket"), Cree chief
 Noel Starblanket (born 1946), First Nation leader

First Nation

 Star Blanket Cree Nation